José Carlos is a Portuguese/Spanish given name. Notable people with the name include:

José Carlos Amaral Vieira, Brazilian composer and pianist
José Carlos Araújo Nunes, Portuguese footballer
José Carlos (footballer, born 1941), Portuguese footballer
José Carlos (footballer, born 1988), Brazilian footballer
José Carlos Fernandes Vidigal, Angolan footballer and manager
José Carlos (footballer, born 1987), Spanish footballer
José Carlos Garcia Leal, Brazilian footballer
José Carlos (footballer, born 1966), Portuguese footballer
José Carlos (footballer, born 1996), Spanish footballer
Jose Emmanuel L. Carlos, Filipino politician

See also
José
Zé Carlos
Carlos (disambiguation)

Portuguese masculine given names
Spanish masculine given names